Renata Salecl (born 1962) is a Slovene philosopher, sociologist and legal theorist. She is a senior researcher at the Institute of Criminology, Faculty of Law at the University of Ljubljana, and holds a professorship at Birkbeck College, University of London. She has been a visiting professor at London School of Economics, lecturing on the topic of emotions and law. Every year she lectures at Benjamin N. Cardozo School of Law (New York), on Psychoanalysis and Law, and she has also been teaching courses on neuroscience and law. Since 2012 she has been visiting professor at the Department of Social Science, Heath and Medicine at King's College London. Her books have been translated into fifteen languages. In 2017, she was elected as a member of the Slovene Academy of Science.

Life and civic activism

In the 1980s Salecl became associated with the intellectual circle known as the Ljubljana school of psychoanalysis, which combined the study of Lacanian psychoanalysis with the philosophic legacy of German idealism and critical theory. In the late 1980s she became active in the left liberal opposition to the ruling Slovenian Communist party. In the first democratic elections in Slovenia in April 1990 she unsuccessfully ran for the Slovenian Parliament on the list of the Alliance of Socialist Youth of Slovenia - Liberal Party. After 1990 she left party politics but remained active in public life, especially as a commentator.

She was married to the Slovenian Marxist–Lacanian philosopher Slavoj Žižek.
They have one son.

Work
She studied philosophy at the University of Ljubljana, graduating with a thesis on Michel Foucault's theory of power under the supervision of the Marxist philosopher Božidar Debenjak. From 1986, she started working as a researcher at the Institute of Criminology at the Faculty of Law in Ljubljana, In 1991, she obtained a PhD at the Department of Sociology at the University of Ljubljana under the supervision of Drago Braco Rotar. Her work focuses on bringing together law, criminology and psychoanalysis. She has worked on the theories of punishment, and on the analysis of the relation between late capitalist insistence on choice and the increased feelings of anxiety and guilt in post-modern subjects. The book also analyses how matters of choice apply to law and criminology.

Salecl is associated with the critical legal studies movement. She was Centennial Professor at the department of law at the London School of Economics (LSE) and is now visiting professor at the LSE's BIOS Centre for the Study of Bioscience, Biomedicine, Biotechnology and Society, and holds a full professorship at the School of Law at Birkbeck College, University of London. She often teaches as Visiting Professor at Cardozo School of Law in New York. She has been fellow at the Institute for Advanced Study, Berlin (1997/8), visiting professor at the Humboldt University in Berlin, visiting humanities professor at George Washington University in Washington, DC, and visiting professor at Duke University.

She also writes columns in various European newspapers, including Delo (Ljubljana) and La Vanguardia (Barcelona).

Awards
 In 2010, she was awarded the title of "Slovenian woman scientist of the year". In December of the same year, she was a candidate for a "Slovenian person of the year" by the daily newspaper Delo.
 In 2011, she was named the most successful woman in Slovenia and got the title ONA 365 by the women magazine Ona (English: SHE magazine).

Selected bibliography

In English

In Slovene

In Spanish

Chapters in books 
 Salecl, Renata (2001), "Cut in the body: from clitoridectomy to body art", in Ahmed, Sara, Stacey, Jackie, Thinking Through the Skin, London: Routledge, pp.21-35, .

See also
Overchoice
Tyranny of small decisions
The Paradox of Choice: Why More Is Less

References

External links 
 Interview with photo (2010) 
 RSA Animate Video on Choice

Academic staff of the University of Ljubljana
People from Slovenj Gradec
Slovenian women philosophers
Slovenian sociologists
University of Ljubljana alumni
1962 births
Living people
Academics of the London School of Economics
Slavoj Žižek
Slovenian women sociologists
20th-century Slovenian philosophers
21st-century Slovenian philosophers